The 1931–32 Toronto Maple Leafs season was Toronto's 15th season in the NHL.  The Maple Leafs were coming off their best regular season in team history in 1930–31, and the club set team records in wins and points, with 23 and 53 respectively, finishing in second place in the Canadian Division.  Toronto then won three playoff rounds to win the Stanley Cup, first as the Maple Leafs, and third in the history of the franchise.

Offseason

Prior to the season, the NHL announced that the schedule would increase from 44 games to 48.  Also, the Maple Leafs announced they were moving from the Arena Gardens, which had been their home since entering the NHL in 1917, to the newly constructed Maple Leaf Gardens.

Regular season
Toronto started the season off slowly, going win-less in their first five games, which cost head coach Art Duncan his job. He was replaced by former Chicago Black Hawks head coach Dick Irvin. Having to travel from his home in Winnipeg, Irvin joined the club for the December 1 game after Smythe coached the team to their first win of the season against the Boston Bruins. The hiring of Irvin would pay off immediately, as the Leafs got hot and had an 8–3–2 record in his first month behind the bench. The Leafs continued to play good hockey for the remainder of the season, finishing with a team record 23 victories, and tying the club record with 53 points.  Toronto finished in second place in the Canadian Division, behind the Montreal Canadiens, and qualified for the playoffs for the second straight season.

The Leafs offense was led by Busher Jackson, who led the NHL with 53 points, scoring 28 goals and added 25 assists in 48 games.  Linemate Joe Primeau led the league with 37 assists to finish second to Jackson in league scoring with 50 points. Charlie Conacher posted an NHL high 34 goals, and finished fourth in league scoring with 48 points.  Defenceman King Clancy anchored the blueline, scoring 10 goals and 19 points, while Red Horner provided the team toughness, getting a club high 97 penalty minutes. In goal, Lorne Chabot had another very solid season, winning a team high 22 games while posting a 2.36 GAA and earning four shutouts along the way.

Maple Leaf Gardens

Overseen by  Leafs managing director Conn Smythe, the new Maple Leaf Gardens was built in a six-month period during 1931 at a total cost of $1.5 million. The site was purchased from The T. Eaton Co. Ltd. for a price said to be $150,000 below market value. The building was designed by the architectural firm of Ross and Macdonald. Construction was partly funded through a public offering of 7% preferred shares in a new corporation "Maple Leaf Gardens Limited" at $10 each, with a free common share for each five preferred shares purchased. Smythe and the Toronto Maple Leaf Hockey Club Ltd. transferred ownership of the hockey team to the new corporation in return for shares.

The contract to construct the building was awarded to Thomson Brothers Construction of Port Credit in Toronto Township. Thomson Bros bid just under $990,000 for the project, the lowest of ten tenders received, mainly due to the fact that amongst the Thomson Brothers' various enterprises they had much of the sub contract work covered, others could not compete in this manner. That price did not include steel work, which was estimated at an additional $100,000. Construction began at midnight on June 1, 1931. In what is to this day considered to be an outstanding accomplishment, the Gardens was built in under five months and two weeks.

W. A. Hewitt, sports editor of the Toronto Star, was hired as general manager to oversee all events other than professional hockey. His son, Foster Hewitt, was hired to run the radio broadcasts.

The Gardens opened on November 12, 1931, with the Maple Leafs losing 2–1 to the Chicago Black Hawks. Reported attendance on opening night was 13,542. The Leafs would go on to win their first Stanley Cup (third of the Toronto franchise) that season.

Season standings

Record vs. opponents

Playoffs

The Maple Leafs would open the playoffs against the Chicago Black Hawks in a two-game, total goal series.  The Black Hawks had a record of 18–19–11, earning 47 points, and finished in second place in the American Division.  The Leafs dropped the opening game by a close 1–0 score at Chicago Stadium, however, they returned home for the second game, and Toronto easily defeated the Black Hawks 6–1, and won the total goal series by a score of 6–2, advancing to the second round of the playoffs.

Toronto's next opponent was the Montreal Maroons in another two game, total goal series.  The Maroons finished behind Toronto in the Canadian Division, as they finished with a 19–22–7 record, registering 43 points.  The Maroons defeated the Detroit Falcons in the opening round of the playoffs.  The series opened at the Montreal Forum, and the game ended in a 1–1 tie.  The second game was played at Maple Leaf Gardens, and Toronto used home ice to their advantage, defeating the Maroons 3–2 in overtime to win the series 4–3, and move to the Stanley Cup finals.

The Leafs would play the New York Rangers in a best of 5 series to determine the winner of the 1932 Stanley Cup Finals.  The Rangers finished in first place in the American Division with a 23–17–8 record, earning 54 points.  They had defeated the Montreal Canadiens in four games to advance to the finals.  The series opened at Madison Square Garden in New York, however, it was the Leafs who struck first, defeating the Rangers 6–4.  The second game of the series was moved from New York to the Boston Garden due to the circus having been booked for the Rangers home arena.  Toronto took full advantage of this, and easily defeated the Rangers 6–2 to come within a victory of the Stanley Cup.  The series moved to Toronto for the third game, and Toronto completed the sweep, defeating New York 6–4, and winning their third Stanley Cup in team history, and first since 1922, when they were still named the Toronto St. Pats.  The "Kid Line" of Jackson, Conacher, and Primeau combined for 8 goals in the 3 games.

Schedule and results

Regular season

Playoffs
Toronto Maple Leafs 6, Chicago Black Hawks 2

Toronto Maple Leafs 4, Montreal Maroons 3

Toronto Maple Leafs 3, New York Rangers 0

 Game 2 played in Boston

Player statistics

Regular season
Scoring

Goaltending

Playoffs
Scoring

Goaltending

Awards and records

Transactions

June 8, 1931: Claimed Harold Darragh off Waivers from the Boston Bruins
September 26, 1931: Claimed Frank Finnigan and Syd Howe in the Dispersal Draft from the Ottawa Senators for 1931–32 season
February 8, 1932: Acquired Earl Miller from the Chicago Black Hawks for cash
February 14, 1932: Signed Free Agent Fred Robertson

See also
 1931–32 NHL season

References

SHRP Sports
The Internet Hockey Database
Goalies Archive
National Hockey League Guide & Record Book 2007

Toronto Maple Leafs seasons
Toronto
Toronto
Stanley Cup championship seasons